The Bust of Francesco Barberini is a marble sculpture by the Italian artist Gian Lorenzo Bernini, now in the National Gallery of Art in Washington, D.C. It was executed in 1623. It was commissioned by Pope Urban VIII, who was nephew of Francesco Barberini, an apostolic protonotary. Francesco had actually died in 1600 so Bernini created the bust from an existing painted portrait. The painted portrait is in Corsini Collection in Florence; Bernini made close use of the design, although the painting was a three quarter portrait as opposed to a bust of head, shoulders and upper body.

Provenance

The sculpture was given to the National Gallery of Art in Washington D.C. in 1961 as part of the Kress Collection donation. The Kress Foundation had bought the sculpture in 1950 from Count Alessandro Contini-Bonacossi, as part of a collection of 125 paintings and the one Bernini sculpture.

See also
Barberini family
Francesco Barberini (the subject's great-nephew)
List of works by Gian Lorenzo Bernini

References

External links
 National Gallery of Art, Washington D.C.
 

1620s sculptures
Busts in Washington, D.C.
Marble sculptures in Washington, D.C.
Busts by Gian Lorenzo Bernini